Bouvrage is a soft drink produced by Ella Drinks Limited near Brechin, Angus, Scotland. The original Bouvrage is made with raspberry juice (as well as lightly carbonated water, sugar, citric acid and flavourings).
The company has since introduced two other drinks, one made with blaeberries and the other with strawberries.

The drink is generally sampled at food fairs in Scotland and is sold at delicatessens and independent food stores.

References

Scottish drinks
Angus, Scotland